WKKZ (92.7 FM) is a radio station broadcasting a modern adult contemporary format, and licensed to Dublin, Georgia, United States.  The station is currently owned by Kirby Broadcasting Company.

History
The station went on the air as WXLI on December 1, 1978. On March 3, 1980, the station changed its call sign to the current WKKZ.
Currently Jeff Kidd and Mike 'Cannonball' Alligood present the morning show and broadcast weekdays from 6am-9am live.

References

External links

KKZ